San Giovanni Battista is a baroque church in the historic center of Ravenna, Italy, built in 1689 by Pietro Grossi.

The church here, a  three-nave basilica, was built in the 6th century. In 1688, it was strongly damaged by an earthquake, demolished, and a new building was constructed in the same place. Parts of the apse of the old building survived, as well as the bell-tower built in the 9th-10th centuries.

References

Roman Catholic churches in Ravenna
Buildings and structures completed in 1689
17th-century Roman Catholic church buildings in Italy